Ectoedemia leptognathos is a moth of the family Nepticulidae. It was described by Rimantas Puplesis and Arunas Diškus in 1996. It is known from Turkmenistan.

References

Nepticulidae
Moths of Asia
Moths described in 1996